Michelangelo Console (Palermo, 24 July 1812 – Palermo, 13 May 1897) was an Italian botanist primarily known for his work on cacti.

Life and work
Michelangelo Console was professor of botany at the Palermo Botanical Garden, where he worked with French botanist Charles Antoine Lemaire. Console described the cactus genus Myrtillocactus in 1897, shortly before his death.

Charles Antoine Lemaire named the cactus genus Consolea in honor of Console.

Selected works
 Su taluni casi morfologici nella famiglia delle Cactaceae. In: Il Naturalista siciliano. Palermo 1883, p. 78–79, Online
 Myrtillocactus, nuovo genere di Cactaceae. In: Bollettino del Reale Orto Botanico di Palermo. Vol. 1, No. 1, 1897, p. 8–10.

References

Italian botanists
Scientists from Palermo
1812 births
1897 deaths